Kohinoor Film Company was an Indian film studio established in 1918 by Dwarkadas Sampat (1884-1958).

Along with Ranjit Movietone and the Imperial Film Company it was the largest movie studio when Indian talkies began in the 1930s.

Kohinoor didn't just produce some of the most successful films of its era. The studio also trained such people as Nandlal Jaswantlal and Mohan Bhavnani, and produced artists such as Goharbai, Zebunissa and Rampiyari.

History
In 1918, the film pioneer Dwarkadas Narendas Sampat (1884-1958) established the Kohinoor Film Company.

Sampat introduced wooden sets, doing away with the painted sceneries of the past.

In 1923 a fire at the studio destroyed negatives of the company's films. However, Eastman Kodak willingly granted further credit for raw film stock.

Filmography
Between 1919 and 1929, Sampat and Kohinoor made 98 films, including

Vikram Urvashi (1920)
Anusuya (1921)
Bhakta Vidur (1921)
Kanjibhai Rathod directed this mythological allegory, which alluded directly to political issues of the day. In the wake of the Rowlatt Act in 1919, which put restrictions on Indian imports, protests and agitation broke out, thrusting Mahatma Gandhi into the national spotlight. This film adapted a section from the Mahabharata that concerns the fall of an empire at the hands of two warring clans, the Pandavas and the Kauravas. More overtly, the film's main character, Vidur (Dwarkadas Sampat), is a dead ringer for Gandhi, complete with his trademark hat and khaddar shirt. This film became something of a cause célèbre in India, as it generated a huge censorship controversy and was ultimately banned in Karachi and Madras. The District Magistrate of Karachi ordered the ban, saying it is likely to excite disaffection against the government and incite people to non-cooperation.
Kala Nag (1924)
Kulin Kanta (1925)
Handsome Blackguard (1925)
Telephone Girl (1926)

References

Sources
Crow, Jonathan; Allmovie
Garga, B.D.; So Many Cinemas, Eminence Designs Private Limited.
Rajadhyaksh, Ashish & Willeme, Paul; Encyclopaedia of Indian Cinema, Oxford University Press.

Film production companies based in Mumbai
Mass media companies established in 1918
1918 establishments in India